During the 1980–81 season, Heart of Midlothian F.C. competed in the Scottish Premier Division, the Scottish Cup, the Scottish League Cup, the Anglo-Scottish Cup and the East of Scotland Shield

Fixtures

Friendlies

Anglo-Scottish Cup

League Cup

Scottish Cup

East of Scotland Shield

Scottish Premier Division

Scottish Premier Division table

Squad information

|}

See also
List of Heart of Midlothian F.C. seasons

References

Statistical Record 80-81

External links
Official Club website

Heart of Midlothian F.C. seasons
Heart of Midlothian